The following is an alphabetical list of topics related to the Republic of Panamá.

0–9

.pa – Internet country code top-level domain for Panamá

A
Adjacent countries:

Alfredo Sinclair
Ambassador of Panama to the United Nations
Americas
North America
Central America
Islands of Panama
North Atlantic Ocean
Mar Caribe (Caribbean Sea)
North Pacific Ocean
Golfo de Panamá (Gulf of Panama)
Arnulfista Party
Arnulfo Arias
Atlas of Panama

B
Bayano
Bayano Kamani
Belisario Porras
Bidlack Mallarino Treaty
Bridge of the Americas
Bruce Chen

C
Capital of Panama:  Ciudad de Panamá (Panama City)
Caribbean Sea
Carlos Lee
Categories:
:Category:Panama
:Category:Buildings and structures in Panama
:Category:Communications in Panama
:Category:Economy of Panama
:Category:Education in Panama
:Category:Environment of Panama
:Category:Geography of Panama
:Category:Government of Panama
:Category:Health in Panama
:Category:History of Panama
:Category:Images of Panama
:Category:Law of Panama
:Category:Military of Panama
:Category:Panama stubs
:Category:Panamanian culture
:Category:Panamanian people
:Category:Panama-related lists
:Category:Politics of Panama
:Category:Science and technology in Panama
:Category:Society of Panama
:Category:Sport in Panama

:Category:Transportation in Panama
commons:Category:Panama
Celestino Caballero
Centennial Bridge, Panama
Central America
Chagres River
Chinese in Panama
Chinatown
Ciudad de Panamá (Panama City) – Capital of Panama
Ciudad del Saber
Coat of arms of Panama
Coiba
Colón Province
Communications in Panama
Culebra Cut
Cuisine of Panama
Culture of Panama

D
Danilo Pérez
Daphne Rubin-Vega
Darién scheme
Democratic Change (Panama)
Democratic Revolutionary Party
Demographics of Panama

E
Economy of Panama
Einar Díaz
El General
Elections:
1999 Panamanian election
2004 Panamanian election
Embera-Wounaan people
Ernesto Pérez Balladares
Eusebio Pedroza

F

Flag of Panamá
Foreign relations of Panama

G
Gaillard Cut
Gatun Dam
Gatun Lake
Geography of Panama
Gilbert Arenas
Guillermo Endara
Gulf of Panama (Golfo de Panamá)

H
Harmodio Arias Madrid
Hay–Bunau-Varilla Treaty
Health care in Panama and universal healthcare
Health measures during the construction of the Panama Canal
Herrera Province
Hilario Zapata
"Himno Istmeño"
History of Panama
History of the Panama Canal
Hospitals:
Hospital Nacional
Hospital Santo Tomas
Hugo Spadafora

I
Instituto Oncologico Nacional
International Organization for Standardization (ISO)
ISO 3166-1 alpha-2 country code for Panama: PA
ISO 3166-1 alpha-3 country code for Panama: PAN
ISO 3166-2:PA region codes for Costa Rica
Irving Saladino
Islam in Panama
Islands of Panama
Isthmus of Panama

J
Jaime Penedo
John McCain
Jordana Brewster
Jorge Dely Valdés
José Domingo de Obaldia
José Macías
Juan Berenguer
Juan Carlos Navarro (politician)
Julio Dely Valdés
Julio Linares
Justine Pasek

K
Kuna (people)
Kuna Yala

L
Laffit Pincay, Jr.
Latin America
LGBT rights in Panama (Gay rights)
Lía Borrero
Lists related to Panama:
Ambassador of Panama to the United Nations
Diplomatic missions of Panama
List of airports in Panama
List of birds of Panama
List of cities in Panama
List of diplomatic missions in Panama
List of earthquakes in Panama
List of football clubs in Panama
List of Governors of Panama Canal Zone
List of heads of state of Panama
List of hospitals in Panama
List of islands of Panama
List of mammals in Panama
List of newspapers in Panama
List of Panamanian films
List of Panamanians
List of Panama-related topics
List of players from Panama in Major League Baseball
List of political parties in Panama
List of radio stations in Panama
List of rivers of Panama
List of Roman Catholic dioceses in Panama
List of tallest buildings in Panama City
List of volcanoes in Panama
Provinces and regions of Panama
Topic outline of Panama
Lloyd La Beach
Lorenzo Charles
Los Santos Province
Luis Tejada

M
Manuel Amador Guerrero
Manuel Antonio Noriega
Mar Caribe
Mariano Rivera
Martín Torrijos
Martyrs' Day (Panama)
Military of Panama
Mireya Moscoso
Molas
Music of Panama

N
National anthem of Panama
National Assembly of Panama
National Liberal Party (Panama)
Nationalist Republican Liberal Movement
Nele Kantule
Ngöbe-Buglé Comarca
Ngöbe Buglé people
North America

O
Olga Sinclair
Olmedo Sáenz
Omar Torrijos
Oscar Willis Layne

P
Pacific Ocean
Panama (Panamá)
Panama Canal:
Panama Canal Authority
Panama Canal Expansion Proposal
2006 Panama Canal expansion referendum
Panama Canal fence
Panama Canal Locks
Panama Canal Zone
Panama City (Ciudad de Panamá) – Capital of Panama
Panamá City Panamá Temple - LDS Temple
Panama Railway
Panamax
Pearl Islands
Pedro Alcázar
People's Party
Politics of Panama
Pollera
Provinces of Panama

Q

R
Ramiro Mendoza
Reginald Beckford
Republic of Panama (República de Panamá)
Roberto Vásquez
Roberto Corbin
Roberto Durán
Roberto Kelly
Rod Carew
Rolando Blackman
Rubén Blades

S
San Blas Islands
Scouting in Panama
Solidarity Party
South America
Spanish colonization of the Americas
Spanish language
Stefanie de Roux

T
Taboga Island
Tocumen International Airport
Topic outline of Panama
Torrijos-Carter Treaties
Transport in Panama

U
United Nations founding member state 1945
United States invasion of Panama, 1989

V
Vicente Mosquera
Victoriano Lorenzo
Volcán Barú

W
Water supply and sanitation in Panama
Watermelon Riot

Wikipedia:WikiProject Topic outline/Drafts/Topic outline of Panama

X

Y

Z
Zonian

See also

List of Central America-related topics
List of international rankings
Lists of country-related topics
Topic outline of geography
Topic outline of North America
Topic outline of Panama
Topic outline of South America
United Nations

References

External links

 
Panama